Manuel Silva may refer to:

 Manuel Silva (athlete) (born 1978), Portuguese Olympic athlete
 Manuel Silva (sport shooter) (born 1971), Portuguese sport shooter
 Manuel Silva (basketball) (born 1968), Angolan basketball coach and former player
 Manuel Silva (swimmer), Brazilian former Olympic swimmer
 Manuel Fernando Silva (born 1973), Portuguese volleyball player
 Manuel Aranda da Silva, minister in the Mozambican Government
 Manuel Pereira da Silva (1920–2003), Portuguese sculptor
 Manu Silva (born 2001), Portuguese footballer
 Manuel Camilo Silva, mayor of the commune of Pichilemu